"I'd Rather Be Blue" (or I'd Rather Be Blue over You (Than Be Happy with Somebody Else)") is a song from the 1928 Warner Bros. musical film My Man, in which it was sung by Fanny Brice.

Composition 
The song was written by Fred Fisher and Billy Rose.

Track listing 
10" 78 rpm shellac record – Victor 21815, United States
A. "I'd Rather Be Blue"
B. "If You Want the Rainbow (You Must Have the Rain)"

Fanny Brice version (1928) 
Fanny Brice performed the song ("Comedienne with Orchestra") on a Victor recording (21815-A), which may be auditioned at "I'd Rather Be Blue (Victor recording on the Internet Archive).

Barbra Streisand version 

The song was performed by Barbra Streisand in the 1968 film Funny Girl. Her version reached number 19 on the Billboard Easy Listening chart.

Track listing 
7" 45 rpm vinyl single – Columbia 4-44622, 1968, United States
 "Funny Girl"
 "I'd Rather Be Blue over You (Than Be Happy with Somebody Else)"

Charts

References 

1928 songs
Fanny Brice songs
Songs written by Fred Fisher
Songs with lyrics by Billy Rose
Victor Talking Machine Company singles
Barbra Streisand songs
1968 singles
Columbia Records singles